Sir Ahmed Salman Rushdie  (born 19 June 1947) is an Indian-born British-American novelist. His work often combines magic realism with historical fiction and primarily deals with connections, disruptions, and migrations between Eastern and Western civilizations, typically set on the Indian subcontinent.

Rushdie's second novel, Midnight's Children (1981), won the Booker Prize in 1981 and was deemed to be "the best novel of all winners" on two occasions, marking the 25th and the 40th anniversary of the prize.

After his fourth novel, The Satanic Verses (1988), Rushdie became the subject of several assassination attempts and death threats, including a fatwa calling for his death issued by Ruhollah Khomeini, the supreme leader of Iran. Numerous killings and bombings have been carried out by extremists who cite the book as motivation, sparking a debate about censorship and religiously motivated violence. On 12 August 2022, a man stabbed Rushdie after rushing onto the stage where the novelist was scheduled to deliver a lecture at an event in Chautauqua, New York.

In 1983, Rushdie was elected a fellow of the Royal Society of Literature. Rushdie was knighted in 2007 for his services to literature. In 2008, The Times ranked him 13th on its list of the 50 greatest British writers since 1945. Since 2000, Rushdie has lived in the United States. He was named Distinguished Writer in Residence at the Arthur L. Carter Journalism Institute of New York University in 2015. Earlier, he taught at Emory University. He was elected to the American Academy of Arts and Letters. In 2012, he published Joseph Anton: A Memoir, an account of his life in the wake of the events following The Satanic Verses.

Biography

Early life and family background
Ahmed Salman Rushdie was born in Bombay on 19 June 1947 during the British Raj, into an Indian Kashmiri Muslim family. He is the son of Anis Ahmed Rushdie, a Cambridge-educated lawyer-turned-businessman, and Negin Bhatt, a teacher. Rushdie's father was dismissed from the Indian Civil Services (ICS) after it emerged that the birth certificate submitted by him had changes to make him appear younger than he was. Rushdie has three sisters. He wrote in his 2012 memoir that his father adopted the name Rushdie in honour of Averroes (Ibn Rushd).

Rushdie grew up in Bombay and was educated at the Cathedral and John Connon School in Fort, South Bombay, before moving to England to attend Rugby School in Rugby, Warwickshire, and then King's College, Cambridge, from which he graduated with a Bachelor of Arts degree in history.

Personal life
Rushdie has married five times and divorced four times, and has had at least one other significant relationship. He was first married to Clarissa Luard, literature officer of the Arts Council of England, from 1976 to 1987. The couple had a son, Zafar, born in 1979, who is married to the London-based jazz singer Natalie Rushdie. He left Clarissa Luard in the mid-1980s for the Australian writer Robyn Davidson, to whom he was introduced by their common friend Bruce Chatwin. Rushdie and Davidson never married, and they had split up by the time his divorce from Clarissa came through in 1987. Rushdie's second wife was the American novelist Marianne Wiggins; they were married in 1988 and divorced in 1993. His third wife, from 1997 to 2004, was British editor and author Elizabeth West; they have a son, Milan, born in 1997. In 2004, very shortly after his third divorce, Rushdie married Padma Lakshmi, an Indian-born actress, model, and host of the American reality-television show Top Chef. Rushdie stated that Lakshmi had asked for a divorce in January 2007, and later that year, in July, the couple filed it. In 2021, Rushdie married American poet and novelist Rachel Eliza Griffiths.

In 1999, Rushdie had an operation to correct ptosis, a problem with the levator palpebrae superioris muscle that causes drooping of the upper eyelid. According to Rushdie, it made it increasingly difficult for him to open his eyes. "If I hadn't had an operation, in a couple of years from now I wouldn't have been able to open my eyes at all", he said.

Since 2000, Rushdie has lived in the United States, mostly near Union Square in Lower Manhattan, New York City. He is a fan of the English football club Tottenham Hotspur.

Career

Copywriter
Rushdie worked as a copywriter for the advertising agency Ogilvy & Mather, where he came up with "irresistibubble" for Aero and "Naughty but Nice" for cream cakes, and for the agency Ayer Barker (until 1982), for whom he wrote the line "That'll do nicely" for American Express. Collaborating with musician Ronnie Bond, Rushdie wrote the words for an advertising record on behalf of the now defunct Burnley Building Society that was recorded at Good Earth Studios, London. The song was called "The Best Dreams" and was sung by George Chandler. It was while at Ogilvy that Rushdie wrote Midnight's Children, before becoming a full-time writer.

Literary works

Early works and literary breakthrough
Rushdie's first novel, Grimus (1975), a part-science fiction tale, was generally ignored by the public and literary critics. His next novel, Midnight's Children (1981), catapulted him to literary notability. This work won the 1981 Booker Prize and, in 1993 and 2008, was awarded the Best of the Bookers as the best novel to have received the prize during its first 25 and 40 years. Midnight's Children follows the life of a child, born at the stroke of midnight as India gained its independence, who is endowed with special powers and a connection to other children born at the dawn of a new and tumultuous age in the history of the Indian sub-continent and the birth of the modern nation of India. The character of Saleem Sinai has been compared to Rushdie. However, the author refuted the idea of having written any of his characters as autobiographical, stating, "People assume that because certain things in the character are drawn from your own experience, it just becomes you. In that sense, I've never felt that I've written an autobiographical character."

After Midnight's Children, Rushdie wrote Shame (1983), in which he depicts the political turmoil in Pakistan, basing his characters on Zulfikar Ali Bhutto and General Muhammad Zia-ul-Haq. Shame won France's Prix du Meilleur Livre Étranger (Best Foreign Book) and was a close runner-up for the Booker Prize. Both these works of postcolonial literature are characterised by a style of magic realism and the immigrant outlook that Rushdie is very conscious of as a member of the Kashmiri diaspora.

Rushdie wrote a non-fiction book about Nicaragua in 1987 called The Jaguar Smile. This book has a political focus and is based on his first-hand experiences and research at the scene of Sandinista political experiments. He became interested in Nicaragua after he had been a neighbour of Madame Somoza, wife of the former Nicaraguan dictator, and his son Zafar was born around the time of the Nicaraguan revolution.

The Satanic Verses and Haroun and the Sea of Stories
His most controversial work, The Satanic Verses, was published in 1988 (see section below). It was followed by Haroun and the Sea of Stories in 1990. Written in the shadow of a fatwa, it is about the dangers of story-telling and an allegorical defence of the power of stories over silence.

Further works 1990s and 2000s
In addition to novels, Rushdie has published many short stories, including those collected in East, West (1994). The Moor's Last Sigh, a family epic ranging over some 100 years of India's history was published in 1995. The Ground Beneath Her Feet (1999) is a remaking of the myth of Orpheus that presents an alternative history of modern rock music. The song of the same name by U2 is one of many song lyrics included in the book; hence Rushdie is credited as the lyricist.

Following the novel Fury, set mainly in New York and avoiding the previous sprawling narrative style that spans generations, periods and places, Rushdie's 2005 novel Shalimar the Clown, a story about love and betrayal set in Kashmir and Los Angeles, was hailed as a return to form by a number of critics.

In his 2002 non-fiction collection Step Across This Line, he professes his admiration for the Italian writer Italo Calvino and the American writer Thomas Pynchon, among others. His early influences included Jorge Luis Borges, Mikhail Bulgakov, Lewis Carroll, Günter Grass and James Joyce. Rushdie was a personal friend of Angela Carter's and praised her highly in the foreword of her collection Burning your Boats.

2008 saw the publication of The Enchantress of Florence, one of Rushdie's most challenging works that focuses on the past. It tells the story of a European's visit to Akbar's court, and his revelation that he is a lost relative of the Mughal emperor. The novel was praised in a review in The Guardian as a "sumptuous mixture of history with fable".

His novel Luka and the Fire of Life, a sequel to Haroun and the Sea of Stories, was published in November 2010 to critical acclaim. Earlier that year, he announced that he was writing his memoirs, entitled Joseph Anton: A Memoir, which was published in September 2012.

In 2012, Rushdie became one of the first major authors to embrace Booktrack (a company that synchronises ebooks with customised soundtracks), when he published his short story "In the South" on the platform.

Later works: Novels and essays 2015-2023
2015 saw the publication of Rushdie's novel Two Years Eight Months and Twenty-Eight Nights, a shift back to his old beloved style of magic realism. This novel is designed in the structure of a Chinese mystery box with different layers. Based on the central conflict of scholar Ibn Rushd (from whom Rushdie's family name derives), Rushdie goes on to explore several themes of transnationalism and cosmopolitanism by depicting a war of the universe which a supernatural world of jinns also accompanies.

In 2017, The Golden House, a satirical novel set in contemporary America, was published. 2019 saw the publication of Rushdie's fourteenth novel Quichotte, inspired by Miguel de Cervantes' classic novel Don Quixote.

In 2021 Languages of Truth, a collection of essays written between 2003 and 2020 was published. 

Rushdie's fifteenth novel Victory City, described as an epic tale of a woman who breathes a fantastical empire into existence, was published in February 2023. The book is Rushdie's first released work since he was attacked and injured in 2022.

Critical reception
Rushdie has had a string of commercially successful and critically acclaimed novels. His works have been shortlisted for the Booker Prize five times, in 1981 for Midnight's Children, 1983 for Shame, 1988 for The Satanic Verses, 1995 for The Moor's Last Sigh, and in 2019 for Quichotte. In 1981, he was awarded the prize. His 2005 novel Shalimar the Clown received the prestigious Hutch Crossword Book Award, and, in the UK, was a finalist for the Whitbread Book Awards. It was shortlisted for the 2007 International Dublin Literary Award. Rushdie's works have spawned 30 book-length studies and over 700 articles on his writing. He is frequently mentioned a favourite to win the Nobel Prize in Literature.

Academic and other activities
Rushdie has mentored younger Indian (and ethnic-Indian) writers, influenced an entire generation of Indo-Anglian writers, and is an influential writer in postcolonial literature in general. He opposed the British government's introduction of the Racial and Religious Hatred Act, something he writes about in his contribution to Free Expression Is No Offence, a collection of essays by several writers, published by Penguin in November 2005.

Rushdie was the President of PEN American Center from 2004 to 2006 and founder of the PEN World Voices Festival. In 2007, he began a five-year term as Distinguished Writer in Residence at Emory University in Atlanta, Georgia, where he has also deposited his archives. In May 2008, he was elected a Foreign Honorary Member of the American Academy of Arts and Letters. In 2014, he taught a seminar on British Literature and served as the 2015 keynote speaker  In September 2015, he joined the New York University Journalism Faculty as a Distinguished Writer in Residence.

Rushdie is a member of the advisory board of The Lunchbox Fund, a non-profit organisation that provides daily meals to students of township schools in Soweto of South Africa. He is a member of the advisory board of the Secular Coalition for America, an advocacy group representing the interests of atheistic and humanistic Americans in Washington, D.C., and a patron of Humanists UK (formerly the British Humanist Association). He is a laureate of the International Academy of Humanism. In November 2010 he became a founding patron of Ralston College, a new liberal arts college that has adopted as its motto a Latin translation of a phrase ("free speech is life itself") from an address he gave at Columbia University in 1991 to mark the 200th anniversary of the First Amendment to the United States Constitution.

Film and television
Though he enjoys writing, Rushdie says he would have become an actor if his writing career had not been successful. From early childhood, he dreamed of appearing in Hollywood movies (which he later realised in his frequent cameo appearances).

Rushdie includes fictional television and movie characters in some of his writings. He had a cameo appearance in the film Bridget Jones's Diary based on the book of the same name, which is itself full of literary in-jokes. On 12 May 2006, Rushdie was a guest host on The Charlie Rose Show, where he interviewed Indo-Canadian filmmaker Deepa Mehta, whose 2005 film, Water, faced violent protests. He appears in the role of Helen Hunt's obstetrician-gynecologist in the film adaptation (Hunt's directorial debut) of Elinor Lipman's novel Then She Found Me. In September 2008, and again in March 2009, he appeared as a panellist on the HBO programme Real Time with Bill Maher. Rushdie has said that he was approached for a cameo in Talladega Nights: "They had this idea, just one shot in which three very, very unlikely people were seen as NASCAR drivers. And I think they approached Julian Schnabel, Lou Reed, and me. We were all supposed to be wearing the uniforms and the helmet, walking in slow motion with the heat haze." In the end their schedules did not allow for it.

In 2009, Rushdie signed a petition in support of film director Roman Polanski, calling for his release after Polanski was arrested in Switzerland in relation to his 1977 charge for drugging and raping a 13-year-old girl.

Rushdie collaborated on the screenplay for the cinematic adaptation of his novel Midnight's Children with director Deepa Mehta. The film was also called Midnight's Children. Seema Biswas, Shabana Azmi, Nandita Das, and Irrfan Khan participated in the film. Production began in September 2010; the film was released in 2012.

Rushdie announced in June 2011 that he had written the first draft of a script for a new television series for the US cable network Showtime, a project on which he will also serve as an executive producer. The new series, to be called The Next People, will be, according to Rushdie, "a sort of paranoid science-fiction series, people disappearing and being replaced by other people." The idea of a television series was suggested by his US agents, said Rushdie, who felt that television would allow him more creative control than feature film. The Next People is being made by the British film production company Working Title, the firm behind projects including Four Weddings and a Funeral and Shaun of the Dead.

In 2017, Rushdie appeared as himself in episode 3 of season 9 of Curb Your Enthusiasm, sharing scenes with Larry David to offer advice on how Larry should deal with the fatwa that has been ordered against him.

The Satanic Verses and the fatwā

The publication of The Satanic Verses by Viking Penguin in September 1988 caused immediate controversy in the Islamic world because of what was seen by some to be an irreverent depiction of Muhammad. The title refers to a disputed Muslim tradition that is related in the book. According to this tradition, Muhammad (Mahound in the book) added verses (Ayah) to the Qur'an accepting three Arabian pagan goddesses who used to be worshipped in Mecca as divine beings. According to the legend, Muhammad later revoked the verses, saying the devil tempted him to utter these lines to appease the Meccans (hence the "Satanic" verses). However, the narrator reveals to the reader that these disputed verses were actually from the mouth of the Archangel Gabriel. The book was banned in many countries with large Muslim communities (13 in total: Iran, India, Bangladesh, Sudan, South Africa, Sri Lanka, Kenya, Thailand, Tanzania, Indonesia, Singapore, Venezuela, and Pakistan).

In response to the protests, on 22 January 1989, Rushdie published a column in The Observer that called Muhammad "one of the great geniuses of world history," but noted that Islamic doctrine holds Muhammad to be human, and in no way perfect. He held that the novel is not "an anti-religious novel. It is, however, an attempt to write about migration, its stresses and transformations."

On 14 February 1989—Valentine's Day, and also the day of his close friend Bruce Chatwin's funeral—a fatwā ordering Rushdie's execution was proclaimed on Radio Tehran by Ayatollah Khomeini, the Supreme leader of Iran at the time, calling the book "blasphemous against Islam". Chapter IV of the book depicts the character of an Imam in exile who returns to incite revolt from the people of his country with no regard for their safety. According to Khomeini's son, his father never read the book. A bounty was offered for Rushdie's death, and he was thus forced to live under police protection for several years. On 7 March 1989, the United Kingdom and Iran broke diplomatic relations over the Rushdie controversy.

When, on BBC Radio 4, he was asked for a response to the threat, Rushdie said, "Frankly, I wish I had written a more critical book," and "I'm very sad that it should have happened. It's not true that this book is a blasphemy against Islam. I doubt very much that Khomeini or anyone else in Iran has read the book or more than selected extracts out of context."  Later, he wrote that he was "proud, then and always", of that statement; while he did not feel his book was especially critical of Islam, "a religion whose leaders behaved in this way could probably use a little criticism."

The publication of the book and the fatwā sparked violence around the world, with bookstores firebombed. Muslim communities in several nations in the West held public rallies, burning copies of the book. Several people associated with translating or publishing the book were attacked, seriously injured, and even killed. Many more people died in riots in some countries. Despite the danger posed by the fatwā, Rushdie made a public appearance at London's Wembley Stadium on 11 August 1993, during a concert by U2. In 2010, U2 bassist Adam Clayton recalled that "lead vocalist Bono had been calling Salman Rushdie from the stage every night on the Zoo TV tour. When we played Wembley, Salman showed up in person and the stadium erupted. You [could] tell from [drummer] Larry Mullen, Jr.'s face that we weren't expecting it. Salman was a regular visitor after that. He had a backstage pass and he used it as often as possible. For a man who was supposed to be in hiding, it was remarkably easy to see him around the place."

On 24 September 1998, as a precondition to the restoration of diplomatic relations with the UK, the Iranian government, then headed by Mohammad Khatami, gave a public commitment that it would "neither support nor hinder assassination operations on Rushdie."

Hardliners in Iran have continued to reaffirm the death sentence. In early 2005, Khomeini's fatwā was reaffirmed by Iran's current dictator, Ayatollah Ali Khamenei, in a message to Muslim pilgrims making the annual pilgrimage to Mecca. Additionally, the Revolutionary Guards declared that the death sentence on him is still valid.

Rushdie has reported that he still receives a "sort of Valentine's card" from Iran each year on 14 February letting him know the country has not forgotten the vow to kill him and has jokingly referred it as "my unfunny Valentine" in a reference to the song "My Funny Valentine". He said, "It's reached the point where it's a piece of rhetoric rather than a real threat." Despite the threats on Rushdie personally, he said that his family has never been threatened, and that his mother, who lived in Pakistan during the later years of her life, even received outpourings of support.  Rushdie himself has been prevented from entering Pakistan, however.

A former bodyguard to Rushdie, Ron Evans, planned to publish a book recounting the behaviour of the author during the time he was in hiding. Evans said Rushdie tried to profit financially from the fatwa and was suicidal, but Rushdie dismissed the book as a "bunch of lies" and took legal action against Evans, his co-author and their publisher. On 26 August 2008, Rushdie received an apology at the High Court in London from all three parties. A memoir of his years of hiding, Joseph Anton, was released on 18 September 2012. Joseph Anton was Rushdie's secret alias.

In February 1997, Ayatollah Hasan Sane'i, leader of the bonyad panzdah-e khordad (Fifteenth of Khordad Foundation),
reported that the blood money offered by the foundation for the assassination of Rushdie would be increased from $2 million to $2.5 million. Then a semi-official religious foundation in Iran increased the reward it had offered for the killing of Rushdie from $2.8 million to $3.3 million.

In November 2015, former Indian minister P. Chidambaram acknowledged that banning The Satanic Verses was wrong. In 1998, Iran's former president Mohammad Khatami proclaimed the fatwa "finished"; but it has never been officially lifted, and in fact has been reiterated several times by Ali Khamenei and other religious officials. Yet more money was added to the bounty in February 2016.

Failed assassination attempt (1989)
On 3 August 1989, while Mustafa Mahmoud Mazeh was priming a book bomb loaded with RDX explosives in a hotel in Paddington, Central London, the bomb exploded prematurely, destroying two floors of the hotel and killing Mazeh. A previously unknown Lebanese group, the Organization of the Mujahidin of Islam, said he died preparing an attack "on the apostate Rushdie". There is a shrine in Tehran's Behesht-e Zahra cemetery for Mustafa Mahmoud Mazeh that says he was "Martyred in London, 3 August 1989. The first martyr to die on a mission to kill Salman Rushdie." Mazeh's mother was invited to relocate to Iran, and the Islamic World Movement of Martyrs' Commemoration built his shrine in the cemetery that holds thousands of Iranian soldiers slain in the Iran–Iraq War.

Hezbollah's comments (2006) 
During the 2006 Jyllands-Posten Muhammad cartoons controversy, Hezbollah leader Hassan Nasrallah declared that "If there had been a Muslim to carry out Imam Khomeini's fatwā against the renegade Salman Rushdie, this rabble who insult our Prophet Mohammed in Denmark, Norway and France would not have dared to do so. I am sure there are millions of Muslims who are ready to give their lives to defend our prophet's honour and we have to be ready to do anything for that."

International Guerillas (1990)
In 1990, soon after the publication of The Satanic Verses, a Pakistani film entitled International Gorillay (International Guerillas) was released that depicted Rushdie as a "James Bond-style villain" plotting to cause the downfall of Pakistan by opening a chain of casinos and discos in the country; he is ultimately killed at the end of the movie. The film was popular with Pakistani audiences, and it "presents Rushdie as a Rambo-like figure pursued by four Pakistani guerrillas". The British Board of Film Classification refused to allow it a certificate, as "it was felt that the portrayal of Rushdie might qualify as criminal libel, causing a breach of the peace as opposed to merely tarnishing his reputation." This effectively prevented the release of the film in the UK. Two months later, however, Rushdie himself wrote to the board, saying that while he thought the film "a distorted, incompetent piece of trash", he would not sue if it were released. He later said, "If that film had been banned, it would have become the hottest video in town: everyone would have seen it". While the film was a great hit in Pakistan, it went virtually unnoticed elsewhere.

Al-Qaeda hit list (2010)
In 2010, Anwar al-Awlaki published an Al-Qaeda hit list in Inspire magazine, including Rushdie along with other figures claimed to have insulted Islam, including Ayaan Hirsi Ali, cartoonist Lars Vilks, and three Jyllands-Posten staff members: Kurt Westergaard, Carsten Juste, and Flemming Rose. The list was later expanded to include Stéphane "Charb" Charbonnier, who was murdered in a terror attack on Charlie Hebdo in Paris, along with 11 other people. After the attack, Al-Qaeda called for more killings.

Rushdie expressed his support for Charlie Hebdo. He said, "I stand with Charlie Hebdo, as we all must, to defend the art of satire, which has always been a force for liberty and against tyranny, dishonesty and stupidity ... religious totalitarianism has caused a deadly mutation in the heart of Islam and we see the tragic consequences in Paris today." In response to the attack, Rushdie commented on what he perceived as victim-blaming in the media, stating: "You can dislike Charlie Hebdo.... But the fact that you dislike them has nothing to do with their right to speak. The fact you dislike them certainly doesn't in any way excuse their murder."

Jaipur Literature Festival (2012)

Rushdie was due to appear at the Jaipur Literature Festival in January 2012 in Jaipur, Rajasthan, India. However, he later cancelled his event appearance, and a further tour of India at the time, citing a possible threat to his life as the primary reason. Several days after, he indicated that state police agencies had lied, in order to keep him away, when they informed him that paid assassins were being sent to Jaipur to kill him. Police contended that they were afraid Rushdie would read from the banned The Satanic Verses, and that the threat was real, considering imminent protests by Muslim organizations.

Meanwhile, Indian authors Ruchir Joshi, Jeet Thayil, Hari Kunzru and Amitava Kumar abruptly left the festival, and Jaipur, after reading excerpts from Rushdie's banned novel at the festival. The four were urged to leave by organizers as there was a real possibility they would be arrested.

A proposed video link session between Rushdie and the Jaipur Literature Festival was also cancelled at the last minute after the government pressured the festival to stop it. Rushdie returned to India to address a conference in New Delhi on 16 March 2012.

Chautauqua attack (2022)

On 12 August 2022, while about to start a lecture at the Chautauqua Institution in Chautauqua, New York, Rushdie was attacked by a man who rushed onto the stage and stabbed him repeatedly, including in the neck and abdomen. The attacker was pulled away before being taken into custody by a state trooper; Rushdie was airlifted to UPMC Hamot, a tertiary trauma centre in Erie, Pennsylvania, where he underwent surgery before being put on a ventilator. Security measures at UPMC Hamot were increased due to the potential threat of further attempts on his life. This included 24 hour protection with a security officer outside his room and searches being performed upon entry into the hospital. The suspect was identified as 24-year-old Hadi Matar of Fairview, New Jersey. Later in the day, Rushdie's agent, Andrew Wylie, confirmed that Rushdie had received stab injuries to the liver and hand, and that he might lose an eye. A day later, Rushdie was taken off the ventilator and was able to speak. 

On 23 October 2022, Wylie reported that Rushdie had lost sight in one eye and the use of one hand but survived the murder attempt.

Awards, honours, and recognition
Salman Rushdie has received many plaudits for his writings, including the European Union's Aristeion Prize for Literature, the Premio Grinzane Cavour (Italy), and the Writer of the Year Award in Germany, and many of literature's highest honours.  

Awards and honours include:
 Austrian State Prize for European Literature (1993)
 Booker Prize (1981)
 Doctor Honoris Causa from the University of Liège, Belgium (1999)
Golden PEN Award
Hans Christian Andersen Literature Award (2014)
 Honorary Doctor of Humane Letters from Indiana University (2018)
 Honorary Doctor of Letters from Emory University (2015)
 James Joyce Award from University College Dublin (2008)
 Outstanding Lifetime Achievement in Cultural Humanism from Harvard University (2007)
PEN Pinter Prize (UK)
St. Louis Literary Award from the Saint Louis University Library Associates
Swiss Freethinkers Award 2019

Knighthood

Rushdie was knighted for services to literature in the Queen's Birthday Honours on 16 June 2007. He remarked: "I am thrilled and humbled to receive this great honour, and am very grateful that my work has been recognised in this way." In response to his knighthood, many nations with Muslim majorities protested. Parliamentarians of several of these countries condemned the action, and Iran and Pakistan called in their British envoys to protest formally. Controversial condemnation issued by Pakistan's Religious Affairs Minister Muhammad Ijaz-ul-Haq was in turn rebuffed by former Prime Minister Benazir Bhutto. Several called publicly for his death. Some non-Muslims expressed disappointment at Rushdie's knighthood, claiming that the writer did not merit such an honour and there were several other writers who deserved the knighthood more than Rushdie.

Al-Qaeda condemned the Rushdie honour. The group's then-leader, Ayman al-Zawahiri, was quoted as saying in an audio recording that UK's award for Rushdie was "an insult to Islam", and it was planning "a very precise response."

Rushdie was appointed a Member of the Order of the Companions of Honour (CH) in the 2022 Birthday Honours for services to literature.

Religious and political beliefs

Religious background
Rushdie came from a liberal Muslim family, but he is now an atheist. In a 2006 interview with PBS, Rushdie called himself a "hardline atheist".

In 1989, in an interview following the fatwa, Rushdie said that he was in a sense a lapsed Muslim, though "shaped by Muslim culture more than any other," and a student of Islam. In another interview the same year, he said, "My point of view is that of a secular human being. I do not believe in supernatural entities, whether Christian, Jewish, Muslim or Hindu."

In 1990, in the "hope that it would reduce the threat of Muslims acting on the fatwa to kill him", he issued a statement claiming he had renewed his Muslim faith, had repudiated the attacks on Islam made by characters in his novel, and was committed to working for better understanding of the religion across the world. Rushdie later said that he was only "pretending".

Rushdie advocates the application of higher criticism, pioneered during the late 19th century. In a guest opinion piece printed in The Washington Post and The Times in mid-August 2005, Rushdie called for a reform in Islam.

Rushdie is a critic of moral and cultural relativism. He favours calling things by their true names and constantly argues about what is wrong and what is right. In an interview with Point of Inquiry in 2006, he described his view as follows:

Rushdie is an advocate of religious satire. He condemned the Charlie Hebdo shooting and defended comedic criticism of religions in a comment originally posted on English PEN where he called religions a medieval form of unreason. Rushdie called the attack a consequence of "religious totalitarianism", which according to him had caused "a deadly mutation in the heart of Islam". He said:

When asked about reading and writing as a human right, Rushdie states, "the larger stories, the grand narratives that we live in, which are things like nation, and family, and clan, and so on. Those stories are considered to be treated reverentially. They need to be part of the way in which we conduct the discourse of our lives and to prevent people from doing something very damaging to human nature." Though Rushdie believes the freedoms of literature to be universal, the bulk of his fictions portrays the struggles of the marginally underrepresented. This can be seen in his portrayal of the role of women in his novel Shame. In this novel, Rushdie, "suggests that it is women who suffer most from the injustices of the Pakistani social order." His support of feminism can also be seen in a 2015 interview with New York magazine's The Cut.

Political background

UK politics

In 2006, Rushdie stated that he supported comments by Jack Straw, then-Leader of the House of Commons from Labour, who criticized the wearing of the niqab (a veil that covers all of the face except the eyes). Rushdie stated that his three sisters would never wear the veil. He said, "I think the battle against the veil has been a long and continuing battle against the limitation of women, so in that sense I'm completely on Straw's side."

US politics
Rushdie supported the 1999 NATO bombing of the Federal Republic of Yugoslavia, leading leftist historian Tariq Ali to label Rushdie and other "warrior writers" as "the belligerati". He was supportive of the US-led campaign to remove the Taliban in Afghanistan, which began in 2001 but was a vocal critic of the 2003 war in Iraq. He has stated that while there was a "case to be made for the removal of Saddam Hussein", US unilateral military intervention was unjustifiable. Marxist critic Terry Eagleton, a former admirer of Rushdie's work, criticized him, saying he "cheered on the Pentagon's criminal ventures in Iraq and Afghanistan." Eagleton subsequently apologized for having misrepresented Rushdie's views.

Rushdie supported the election of Democrat Barack Obama for the American presidency and has often criticized the Republican Party. He was involved in the Occupy Movement, both as a presence at Occupy Boston and as a founding member of Occupy Writers. Rushdie is a supporter of gun control, blaming a shooting at a Colorado cinema in July 2012 on the American right to keep and bear arms. He acquired American citizenship in 2016 and voted for Hillary Clinton in that year's election.

Against religious extremism
In the wake of the Jyllands-Posten Muhammad cartoons controversy in March 2006—which many considered an echo of the death threats and fatwā that followed publication of The Satanic Verses in 1989—Rushdie signed the manifesto Together Facing the New Totalitarianism, a statement warning of the dangers of religious extremism. The Manifesto was published in the left-leaning French weekly Charlie Hebdo in March 2006.

When Amnesty International suspended human rights activist Gita Sahgal for saying to the press that she thought the organization should distance itself from Moazzam Begg and his organization, Rushdie said: Amnesty…has done its reputation incalculable damage by allying itself with Moazzam Begg and his group Cageprisoners, and holding them up as human rights advocates. It looks very much as if Amnesty's leadership is suffering from a kind of moral bankruptcy, and has lost the ability to distinguish right from wrong. It has greatly compounded its error by suspending the redoubtable Gita Sahgal for the crime of going public with her concerns. Gita Sahgal is a woman of immense integrity and distinction.… It is people like Gita Sahgal who are the true voices of the human rights movement; Amnesty and Begg have revealed, by their statements and actions, that they deserve our contempt.

In July 2020, Rushdie was one of the 153 signers of the "Harper's Letter" (also known as "A Letter on Justice and Open Debate") that expressed concern that "the free exchange of information and ideas, the lifeblood of a liberal society, is daily becoming more constricted."

South Asian politics and Kashmir
Rushdie has been critical of Pakistan's former Prime Minister Imran Khan, after Khan took personal jabs at him in a 2012 interview where Khan called Rushdie "unbalanced", saying he has the "mindset of a small man", claiming they had "never met" and he would never "want to meet him ever", despite the two being spotted together in public numerous times.

Rushdie has expressed his preference for India over Pakistan on numerous occasions in writing and on live television interviews. In one such interview in 2003, Rushdie claimed "Pakistan sucks" after being asked about why he felt more like an outsider there than in India or England. He cited India's diversity, openness, and "richness of life experience" as his preference over Pakistan's "airlessness", resulting from lack of personal freedom, widespread public corruption, and inter-ethnic tension.

In Indian politics, Rushdie has criticized the Bharatiya Janata Party and its chairperson, current Prime Minister Narendra Modi.

In a 2006 interview about his novel Shalimar the Clown, Rushdie laments the division of Kashmir into zones of Indian and Pakistani administration as having cut his family down the middle. In August 2019, he criticized the revocation of the special status of Jammu and Kashmir, tweeting: "Even from seven thousand miles away it's clear that what's happening in Kashmir is an atrocity. Not much to celebrate this August 15th." He has previously referred to crackdowns in Indian-administered Kashmir as pretexts for the rise of jihadism in the region:The phrase of "crackdown" that the Indian army uses really is a euphemism of mass destruction. And rape. And brutalisation. That happens all the time. It's still happening now. ... The decision to treat all Kashmiris as if they're potential terrorists is what has unleashed this, the kind of "holocaust" against the Kashmiri people. And we know ourselves, from most recent events in Europe, how important it is to resist treating all Muslims as if they're terrorists, but the Indian army has taken the decision to do the opposite of that, to actually decide that everybody is a potential combatant to treat them in that way. And the level of brutality is quite spectacular. And, frankly, without that the jihadists would have had very little response from the Kashmiri people who were not really traditionally interested in radical Islam. So now they're caught between the devil and the deep blue sea, and that's the tragedy of the place. ... And really what I was trying to do was say exactly that the attraction of the jihad in Kashmir arose out of the activities of the Indian army. ...

Bibliography

Novels
Grimus (1975)
Midnight's Children (1981)
Shame (1983)
The Satanic Verses (1988)
The Moor's Last Sigh (1995)
The Ground Beneath Her Feet (1999)
Fury (2001)
Shalimar the Clown (2005)
The Enchantress of Florence (2008)
Two Years Eight Months and Twenty-Eight Nights (2015)
 The Golden House (2017)
 Quichotte (2019)
 Victory City (2023)

Collections
East, West (1994)
Mirrorwork: 50 Years of Indian Writing 1947–1997 (1997, Editor, with Elizabeth West)
The Best American Short Stories (2008, Guest Editor)

Children's books
Haroun and the Sea of Stories (1990)
Luka and the Fire of Life (2010)

Essays and nonfiction
The Jaguar Smile: A Nicaraguan Journey (1987)
In Good Faith, Granta Books (1990)
Imaginary Homelands: Essays and Criticism, 1981–1991 (1992)
The Wizard of Oz: BFI Film Classics, British Film Institute (1992)
Mohandas Gandhi, Time (13 April 1998)
Imagine There Is No Heaven (Extract from Letters to the Six Billionth World Citizen, published in English by Uitgeverij Podium, Amsterdam)
Step Across This Line: Collected Nonfiction 1992–2002 (2002)
The East Is Blue (2004)
"A fine pickle", The Guardian (28 February 2009)
In the South, Booktrack (7 February 2012)
Joseph Anton: A Memoir (2012)
Languages of Truth: Essays 2003–2020 (2021)

See also

 The Butterfly Hunter
 Criticism of Islam
 Censorship in South Asia
 Hysterical realism
 Indians in the New York City metropolitan area
 List of fatwas
 List of Indian writers
 PEN International
 Postmodern literature
 Blasphemy

Notes

References

External links

 
 
 
 Salman Rushdie at The Encyclopedia of Fantasy
 Salman Rushdie at The Encyclopedia of Science Fiction
 
 
 Stuart A. Rose Manuscript, Archives, and Rare Book Library, Emory University: Salman Rushdie papers, 1947–2012

 
1947 births
Living people
Writers from Mumbai
Screenwriters from Mumbai
Male actors from Mumbai
Novelists from Maharashtra
Film producers from Mumbai
American critics of Islam
American people of Indian descent
American people of Kashmiri descent
Atheism in the United Kingdom
British Asian writers
British atheism activists
British critics of Islam
British expatriates in the United States
British former Muslims
British people of Indian descent
British people of Kashmiri descent
Critics of Islamism
Critics of religions
English atheists
English expatriates in the United States
English feminists
English humanists
English memoirists
English people of Indian descent
English people of Kashmiri descent
English social commentators
Fatwas
Fellows of the Royal Society of Literature
Former Muslim critics of Islam
Former Muslims turned agnostics or atheists
Free speech activists
Indian copywriters
Indian emigrants to England
Indian emigrants to the United Kingdom
Indian expatriates in Pakistan
Indian former Muslims
Indian people of Kashmiri descent
Indian television writers
Kashmiri Muslims
Kashmiri people
Knights Bachelor
Magic realism writers
Male feminists
Members of the Order of the Companions of Honour
Naturalised citizens of the United Kingdom
People educated at Rugby School
People with acquired American citizenship
Postcolonial literature
Postmodern writers
Stabbing survivors
Victims of bomb threats
Iran–United Kingdom relations
Cathedral and John Connon School alumni
Alumni of King's College, Cambridge
Emory University faculty
Booker Prize winners
British Book Award winners
Best Screenplay Genie and Canadian Screen Award winners
Iran's Book of the Year Awards recipients
James Tait Black Memorial Prize recipients
20th-century atheists
20th-century English novelists
20th-century Indian essayists
20th-century Indian novelists
21st-century American novelists
21st-century atheists
21st-century English novelists
21st-century Indian dramatists and playwrights
21st-century Indian essayists
21st-century Indian male actors
21st-century Indian novelists